Robert Childers may refer to:

 Robert Caesar Childers (1838–1876), British Orientalist scholar
 Erskine Childers (author) (1870–1922), author and Irish nationalist
 Robert L. Childers, judge in Tennessee

See also
Robert Child (disambiguation)